Janse is a Dutch patronymic surname. People with this name include:

Anthonie Johannes Theodorus Janse (1877–1970), South African entomologist
Axel Janse (1888–1973), Swedish gymnast
Don Janse (1929–1999), American vocal director and arranger
Jens Janse (born 1986), Dutch football player
Joseph Janse (1909–1985), Duth-American chiropractor 
Lilian Janse (born 1973), Dutch politician
Mark Janse (born 1959), Dutch linguist
Margot Janse (born 1969), Dutch chef
Olov Janse (1892–1985), Swedish archaeologist
Pehr Janse (1893–1961), Swedish Army major general 
Albert Janse Ryckman (1642–1737), American businessman and politician
Janse van Rensburg
See Janse van Rensburg
Janse van Vuuren
Günther Janse van Vuuren (born 1995), South African rugby player,
Jaco Janse van Vuuren, paralympic athlete from South Africa

See also
Jansen (surname)

Dutch-language surnames
Patronymic surnames